"Ready Teddy" is a song written by John Marascalco and Robert Blackwell, and first made popular by Little Richard in 1956. Little Richard sang and played piano on the recording, backed by a band consisting of Lee Allen (tenor saxophone), Alvin "Red" Tyler (baritone sax), Edgar Blanchard (guitar), Frank Fields (bass), and Earl Palmer (drums).

It has since been covered by Buddy Holly, The Tornados, Elvis Presley, Tony Sheridan and others, making it something of a rock and roll standard. The composition, an uptempo rock and roll song, received its largest ever recognition on the evening of September 9, 1956, as Presley sang it in front of some 60 million television viewers during his first appearance on The Ed Sullivan Show on CBS, a broadcast which received a Trendex percentage share of 82.6, the largest ever obtained in the history of U.S. television. It was later used in Federico Fellini's La Dolce Vita (1960) as a version by Italian rocker Adriano Celentano.

References

1956 songs
1956 singles
Little Richard songs
Buddy Holly songs
Elvis Presley songs
Songs written by Robert Blackwell
Songs written by John Marascalco
Song recordings produced by Robert Blackwell
Specialty Records singles